Gonzalo Fernández de Córdoba y Larios, 9th Duke of Arión, GE (14 February 1934 – 13 August 2013) was a Spanish sailor. He competed at the 1960 Summer Olympics, the 1968 Summer Olympics and the 1972 Summer Olympics.

See also
Duke of Arión

References

External links
 

1934 births
2013 deaths
Spanish male sailors (sport)
Olympic sailors of Spain
Sailors at the 1960 Summer Olympics – Finn
Sailors at the 1968 Summer Olympics – Flying Dutchman
Sailors at the 1972 Summer Olympics – Dragon
Sportspeople from Málaga
Competitors at the 1955 Mediterranean Games
Sailors at the 1955 Mediterranean Games
Mediterranean Games bronze medalists for Spain
Snipe class sailors